The Tercio of Fuenclara was a Spanish native Tercio who fought in the Battle of Nördlingen in the Thirty Years' War.

References

Thirty Years' War